The Apportionment Act 1820 (1 Geo 4 c 108) was an Act of the Parliament of the United Kingdom.

The whole Act was repealed by section 1(1) of, and Part VII of the Schedule to, the Statute Law (Repeals) Act 1975.

References
Halsbury's Statutes,

United Kingdom Acts of Parliament 1820